Marina Erakovic and Michaëlla Krajicek were the defending champions, but Michaëlla Krajicek did not compete in the juniors that year.

Marina Erakovic played alongside Victoria Azarenka and withdrew from the quarterfinals.

Nikola Fraňková and Alisa Kleybanova won the tournament, defeating Alexa Glatch and Vania King in the final, 7–5, 7–6(7–3).

Seeds

Draw

Finals

Top half

Bottom half

External links 
 Draw

Girls' Doubles
US Open, 2005 Girls' Doubles